Rake Is My Co-Pilot is the debut album of Rake., released in 1993 by VHF Records. It contains two lengthy improvisations, one on each side of the vinyl.

Track listing

Personnel 
Adapted from the Rake Is My Co-Pilot liner notes.
Rake.
Jim Ayre – electric guitar, vocals
Bill Kellum – bass guitar
Carl Moller – drums, saxophone

Release history

References

External links 
 Rake Is My Co-Pilot at Discogs (list of releases)

1994 debut albums
Rake (band) albums
VHF Records albums